The hypothalamic–pituitary–adrenal axis (HPA axis or HTPA axis) is a complex set of direct influences and feedback interactions among three components: the hypothalamus (a part of the brain located below the thalamus), the pituitary gland (a pea-shaped structure located below the hypothalamus), and the adrenal (also called "suprarenal") glands (small, conical organs on top of the kidneys). These organs and their interactions constitute the HPA axis.

The HPA axis is a major neuroendocrine system that controls reactions to stress and regulates many body processes, including digestion, the immune system, mood and emotions, sexuality, and energy storage and expenditure. It is the common mechanism for interactions among glands, hormones, and parts of the midbrain that mediate the general adaptation syndrome (GAS). 

While steroid hormones are produced mainly in vertebrates, the physiological role of the HPA axis and corticosteroids in stress response is so fundamental that analogous systems can be found in invertebrates and monocellular organisms as well.

The HPA axis, hypothalamic–pituitary–gonadal axis (HPG), hypothalamic–pituitary–thyroid axis (HPT), and the hypothalamic–neurohypophyseal system are the four major neuroendocrine systems through which the hypothalamus and pituitary direct neuroendocrine function.

Anatomy
The key elements of the HPA axis are:
 The paraventricular nucleus of the hypothalamus, which contains neuroendocrine neurons which synthesize and secrete vasopressin and corticotropin-releasing hormone (CRH). These two peptides regulate:
 The anterior lobe of the pituitary gland. In particular, CRH and vasopressin stimulate the secretion of adrenocorticotropic hormone (ACTH), once known as corticotropin. ACTH in turn acts on:
 the adrenal cortex, which produces glucocorticoid hormones (mainly cortisol in humans) in response to stimulation by ACTH. Glucocorticoids in turn act back on the hypothalamus and pituitary (to suppress CRH and ACTH production) in a negative feedback cycle.

CRH and vasopressin are released from neurosecretory nerve terminals at the median eminence. CRH is transported to the anterior pituitary through the portal blood vessel system of the hypophyseal stalk and vasopressin is transported by axonal transport to the posterior pituitary gland. There, CRH and vasopressin act synergistically to stimulate the secretion of stored ACTH from corticotrope cells. ACTH is transported by the blood to the adrenal cortex of the adrenal gland, where it rapidly stimulates biosynthesis of corticosteroids such as cortisol from cholesterol. Cortisol is a major stress hormone and has effects on many tissues in the body, including the brain. In the brain, cortisol acts on two types of receptor – mineralocorticoid receptors and glucocorticoid receptors, and these are expressed by many different types of neurons. One important target of glucocorticoids is the hypothalamus, which is a major controlling centre of the HPA axis.

Vasopressin can be thought of as "water conservation hormone" and is also known as "antidiuretic hormone". It is released when the body is dehydrated and has potent water-conserving effects on the kidney. It is also a potent vasoconstrictor.

Important to the function of the HPA axis are some of the feedback loops:
 Cortisol produced in the adrenal cortex will negatively feedback to inhibit both the hypothalamus and the pituitary gland. This reduces the secretion of CRH and vasopressin, and also directly reduces the cleavage of proopiomelanocortin (POMC) into ACTH and β-endorphins.
 Epinephrine and norepinephrine (E/NE) are produced by the adrenal medulla through sympathetic stimulation and the local effects of cortisol (upregulation enzymes to make E/NE). E/NE will positively feedback to the pituitary and increase the breakdown of POMCs into ACTH and β-endorphins.

Function
Release of corticotropin-releasing hormone (CRH) from the hypothalamus is influenced by stress, physical activity, illness, by blood levels of cortisol and by the sleep/wake cycle (circadian rhythm). In healthy individuals, cortisol rises rapidly after wakening, reaching a peak within 30–45 minutes. It then gradually falls over the day, rising again in late afternoon. Cortisol levels then fall in late evening, reaching a trough during the middle of the night. This corresponds to the rest-activity cycle of the organism. An abnormally flattened circadian cortisol cycle has been linked with chronic fatigue syndrome, insomnia and burnout.

The HPA axis has a central role in regulating many homeostatic systems in the body, including the metabolic system, cardiovascular system, immune system, reproductive system and central nervous system. The HPA axis integrates physical and psychosocial influences in order to allow an organism to adapt effectively  to its environment, use resources, and optimize survival.

Anatomical connections between brain areas such as the amygdala, hippocampus, prefrontal cortex and hypothalamus facilitate activation of the HPA axis. Sensory information arriving at the lateral aspect of the amygdala is processed and conveyed to the amygdala's central nucleus, which then projects out to several parts of the brain involved in responses to fear. At the hypothalamus, fear-signaling impulses activate both the sympathetic nervous system and the modulating systems of the HPA axis.

Increased production of cortisol during stress results in an increased availability of glucose in order to facilitate fighting or fleeing. As well as directly increasing glucose availability, cortisol also suppresses the highly demanding metabolic processes of the immune system, resulting in further availability of glucose.

Glucocorticoids have many important functions, including modulation of stress reactions, but in excess they can be damaging. Atrophy of the hippocampus in humans and animals exposed to severe stress is believed to be caused by prolonged exposure to high concentrations of glucocorticoids. Deficiencies of the hippocampus may reduce the memory resources available to help a body formulate appropriate reactions to stress.

Immune system

There is bi-directional communication and feedback between the HPA axis and the immune system. A number of cytokines, such as IL-1, IL-6, IL-10 and TNF-alpha can activate the HPA axis, although IL-1 is the most potent. The HPA axis in turn modulates the immune response, with high levels of cortisol resulting in a suppression of immune and inflammatory reactions. This helps to protect the organism from a lethal overactivation of the immune system, and minimizes tissue damage from inflammation.

The CNS is in many ways "immune privileged", but it plays an important role in the immune system and is affected by it in turn.  The CNS regulates the immune system through neuroendocrine pathways, such as the HPA axis.  The HPA axis is responsible for modulating inflammatory responses that occur throughout the body.

During an immune response, proinflammatory cytokines (e.g. IL-1) are released into the peripheral circulation system and can pass through the blood–brain barrier where they can interact with the brain and activate the HPA axis.  Interactions between the proinflammatory cytokines and the brain can alter the metabolic activity of neurotransmitters and cause symptoms such as fatigue, depression, and mood changes.  Deficiencies in the HPA axis may play a role in allergies and inflammatory/ autoimmune diseases, such as rheumatoid arthritis and multiple sclerosis.

When the HPA axis is activated by stressors, such as an immune response, high levels of glucocorticoids are released into the body and suppress immune response by inhibiting the expression of proinflammatory cytokines (e.g. IL-1, TNF alpha, and IFN gamma) and increasing the levels of anti-inflammatory cytokines (e.g. IL-4, IL-10, and IL-13) in immune cells, such as monocytes and neutrophils

The relationship between chronic stress and its concomitant activation of the HPA axis, and dysfunction of the immune system is unclear; studies have found both immunosuppression and hyperactivation of the immune response.

Stress

Stress and disease

The HPA axis is involved in the neurobiology of mood disorders and functional illnesses, including anxiety disorder, bipolar disorder, insomnia, posttraumatic stress disorder, borderline personality disorder, ADHD, major depressive disorder, burnout, chronic fatigue syndrome, fibromyalgia, irritable bowel syndrome, and alcoholism. Antidepressants, which are routinely prescribed for many of these illnesses, serve to regulate HPA axis function.

Sex differences are prevalent in humans with respect to psychiatric stress-related disorders such as anxiety and depression, where women experience these disorders more often than men. Particularly in rodents, it has been shown that females may lack the ability to tolerate as well as process stress (particularly for chronic stress) due to possible down regulation of glucocorticoid receptor expression as well as a deficiency of FKBP51 binding protein in the cytosol. By constantly activating the HPA axis, this could lead to higher instances of stress and disorders that would only get worse with chronic stress. Specifically in rodents, females show greater activation of the HPA axis following stress than males. These differences also likely arise due to the opposing actions that certain sex steroids have, such as testosterone and oestrogen. Oestrogen functions to enhance stress-activated ACTH and CORT secretion while testosterone functions to decrease HPA axis activation and works to inhibit both ACTH and CORT responses to stress. However, more studies are required to better understand the underlying basis of these sex differences.

Experimental studies have investigated many different types of stress, and their effects on the HPA axis in many different circumstances. Stressors can be of many different types—in experimental studies in rats, a distinction is often made between "social stress" and "physical stress", but both types activate the HPA axis, though via different pathways. Several monoamine neurotransmitters are important in regulating the HPA axis, especially dopamine, serotonin and norepinephrine (noradrenaline). There is evidence that an increase in oxytocin, resulting for instance from positive social interactions, acts to suppress the HPA axis and thereby counteracts stress, promoting positive health effects such as wound healing.

The HPA axis is a feature of mammals and other vertebrates. For example, biologists studying stress in fish showed that social subordination leads to chronic stress, related to reduced aggressive interactions, to lack of control, and to the constant threat imposed by dominant fish. Serotonin (5HT) appeared to be the active neurotransmitter involved in mediating stress responses, and increases in serotonin are related to increased plasma α-MSH levels, which causes skin darkening (a social signal in salmonoid fish), activation of the HPA axis, and inhibition of aggression. Inclusion of the amino acid L-tryptophan, a precursor of 5HT, in the feed of rainbow trout made the trout less aggressive and less responsive to stress. However, the study mentions that plasma cortisol was not affected by dietary L-tryptophan. The drug LY354740 (also known as Eglumegad, an agonist of the metabotropic glutamate receptors 2 and 3) has been shown to interfere in the HPA axis, with chronic oral administration of this drug leading to markedly reduced baseline cortisol levels in bonnet macaques (Macaca radiata); acute infusion of LY354740 resulted in a marked diminution of yohimbine-induced stress response in those animals.

Studies on people show that the HPA axis is activated in different ways during chronic stress depending on the type of stressor, the person's response to the stressor and other factors. Stressors that are uncontrollable, threaten physical integrity, or involve trauma tend to have a high, flat diurnal profile of cortisol release (with lower-than-normal levels of cortisol in the morning and higher-than-normal levels in the evening) resulting in a high overall level of daily cortisol release. On the other hand, controllable stressors tend to produce higher-than-normal morning cortisol. Stress hormone release tends to decline gradually after a stressor occurs. In post-traumatic stress disorder there appears to be lower-than-normal cortisol release, and it is thought that a blunted hormonal response to stress may predispose a person to develop PTSD.

It is also known that HPA axis hormones are related to certain skin diseases and skin homeostasis. There is evidence shown that the HPA axis hormones can be linked to certain stress related skin diseases and skin tumors. This happens when HPA axis hormones become hyperactive in the brain.

Stress and development

Prenatal stress

There is evidence that prenatal stress can influence HPA regulation. In animal experiments, exposure to prenatal stress has been shown to cause a hyper-reactive HPA stress response.  Rats that have been prenatally stressed have elevated basal levels and abnormal circadian rhythm of corticosterone as adults. Additionally, they require a longer time for their stress hormone levels to return to baseline following exposure to both acute and prolonged stressors. Prenatally stressed animals also show abnormally high blood glucose levels and have fewer glucocorticoid receptors in the hippocampus. In humans, prolonged maternal stress during gestation is associated with mild impairment of intellectual activity and language development in their children, and with behaviour disorders such as  attention deficits, schizophrenia, anxiety and depression; self-reported maternal stress is associated with a higher irritability, emotional and attentional problems.

There is growing evidence that prenatal stress can affect HPA regulation in humans. Children who were stressed prenatally may show altered cortisol rhythms. For example, several studies have found an association between maternal depression during pregnancy and childhood cortisol levels. Prenatal stress has also been implicated in a tendency toward depression and short attention span in childhood.

Early life stress

The role of early life stress in programming the HPA axis has been well-studied in animal models. Exposure to mild or moderate stressors early in life has been shown to enhance HPA regulation and promote a lifelong resilience to stress. In contrast, early-life exposure to extreme or prolonged stress can induce a hyper-reactive HPA axis and may contribute to lifelong vulnerability to stress. In one widely replicated experiment, rats subjected to the moderate stress of frequent human handling during the first two weeks of life had reduced hormonal and behavioral HPA-mediated stress responses as adults, whereas rats subjected to the extreme stress of prolonged periods of maternal separation showed heightened physiological and behavioral stress responses as adults.

Several mechanisms have been proposed to explain these findings in rat models of early-life stress exposure. There may be a critical period during development during which the level of stress hormones in the bloodstream contribute to the permanent calibration of the HPA axis. One experiment has shown that, even in the absence of any environmental stressors, early-life exposure to moderate levels of corticosterone was associated with stress resilience in adult rats, whereas exposure to high doses was associated with stress vulnerability.

Another possibility is that the effects of early-life stress on HPA functioning are mediated by maternal care. Frequent human handling of the rat pups may cause their mother to exhibit  more nurturant behavior, such as licking and grooming. Nurturant maternal care, in turn, may enhance HPA functioning in at least two ways. First, maternal care is crucial in maintaining the normal stress hypo responsive period (SHRP), which in rodents, is the first two weeks of life during which the HPA axis is generally non-reactive to stress. Maintenance of the SHRP period may be critical for HPA development, and the extreme stress of maternal separation,  which disrupts the SHRP, may lead to permanent HPA dysregulation. Another way that maternal care might influence HPA regulation is by causing epigenetic changes in the offspring. For example, increased maternal licking and grooming has been shown to alter expression of the glutocorticoid receptor gene implicated in adaptive stress response. At least one human study has identified maternal neural activity patterns in response to video stimuli of mother-infant separation as being associated with decreased glucocorticoid receptor gene methylation in the context of post-traumatic stress disorder stemming from early life stress. Yet clearly, more research is needed to determine if the results seen in cross-generational animal models can be extended to humans.

Though animal models allow for more  control of experimental manipulation, the effects of early life stress on HPA axis function in humans has also been studied. One population that is often studied in this type of research is adult survivors of childhood abuse. Adult survivors of childhood abuse have exhibited increased ACTH concentrations in response to a psychosocial stress task compared to unaffected controls and subjects with depression but not childhood abuse. In one study, adult survivors of childhood abuse that are not depressed show increased ACTH response to both exogenous CRF and normal cortisol release. Adult survivors of childhood abuse that are depressed show a blunted ACTH response to exogenous CRH. A blunted ACTH response is common in depression, so the authors of this work posit that this pattern is likely to be due to the participant's depression and not their exposure to early life stress.

Heim and colleagues have proposed that early life stress, such as childhood abuse, can induce a sensitization of the HPA axis, resulting in particular heightened neuronal activity in response to stress-induced CRH release. With repeated exposure to stress, the sensitized HPA axis may continue to hypersecrete CRH from the hypothalamus. Over time, CRH receptors in the anterior pituitary will become down-regulated, producing depression and anxiety symptoms. This research in human subjects is consistent with the animal literature discussed above.

The HPA axis was present in the earliest vertebrate species, and has remained highly conserved by strong positive selection due to its critical adaptive roles.  The programming of the HPA axis is strongly influenced by the perinatal and early juvenile environment, or "early-life environment".  Maternal stress and differential degrees of caregiving may constitute early life adversity, which has been shown to profoundly influence, if not permanently alter, the offspring's stress and emotional regulating systems. Widely studied in animal models (e.g. licking and grooming/LG in rat pups), the consistency of maternal care has been shown to have a powerful influence on the offspring's neurobiology, physiology, and behavior.
Whereas maternal care improves cardiac response, sleep/wake rhythm, and growth hormone secretion in the neonate, it also suppresses HPA axis activity. In this manner, maternal care negatively regulates stress response in the neonate, thereby shaping his/her susceptibility to stress in later life. These programming effects are not deterministic, as the environment in which the individual develops can either match or mismatch with the former's "programmed" and genetically predisposed HPA axis reactivity. Although the primary mediators of the HPA axis are known, the exact mechanism by which its programming can be modulated during early life remains to be elucidated. Furthermore, evolutionary biologists contest the exact adaptive value of such programming, i.e. whether heightened HPA axis reactivity may confer greater evolutionary fitness.

Various hypotheses have been proposed, in attempts to explain why early life adversity can produce outcomes ranging from extreme vulnerability to resilience, in the face of later stress. Glucocorticoids produced by the HPA axis have been proposed to confer either a protective or harmful role, depending on an individual's genetic predispositions, programming effects of early-life environment, and match or mismatch with one's postnatal environment. The predictive adaptation hypothesis (1), the three-hit concept of vulnerability and resilience (2) and the maternal mediation hypothesis (3) attempt to elucidate how early life adversity can differentially predict vulnerability or resilience in the face of significant stress in later life. These hypotheses are not mutually exclusive but rather are highly interrelated and unique to the individual.

(1) The predictive adaptation hypothesis: this hypothesis is in direct contrast with the diathesis stress model, which posits that the accumulation of stressors across a lifespan can enhance the development of psychopathology once a threshold is crossed. Predictive adaptation asserts that early life experience induces epigenetic change; these changes predict or "set the stage" for adaptive responses that will be required in his/her environment. Thus, if a developing child (i.e., fetus to neonate) is exposed to ongoing maternal stress and low levels of maternal care (i.e., early life adversity), this will program his/her HPA axis to be more reactive to stress. This programming will have predicted, and potentially be adaptive in a highly stressful, precarious environment during childhood and later life. The predictability of these epigenetic changes is not definitive, however – depending primarily on the degree to which the individual's genetic and epigenetically modulated phenotype "matches" or "mismatches" with his/her environment (See: Hypothesis (2)).

(2) Three-Hit Concept of vulnerability and resilience: this hypothesis states that within a specific life context, vulnerability may be enhanced with chronic failure to cope with ongoing adversity. It fundamentally seeks to explicate why, under seemingly indistinguishable circumstances, one individual may cope resiliently with stress, whereas another may not only cope poorly, but consequently develop a stress-related mental illness. The three "hits" – chronological and synergistic – are as follows: genetic predisposition (which predispose higher/lower HPA axis reactivity), early-life environment (perinatal – i.e. maternal stress, and postnatal – i.e. maternal care), and later-life environment (which determines match/mismatch, as well as a window for neuroplastic changes in early programming). (Figure 1)6 The concept of match/mismatch is central to this evolutionary hypothesis. In this context, it elucidates why early life programming in the perinatal and postnatal period may have been evolutionarily selected for. Specifically, by instating specific patterns of HPA axis activation, the individual may be more well equipped to cope with adversity in a high-stress environment. Conversely, if an individual is exposed to significant early life adversity, heightened HPA axis reactivity may "mismatch" him/her in an environment characterized by low stress. The latter scenario may represent maladaptation due to early programming, genetic predisposition, and mismatch. This mismatch may then predict negative developmental outcomes such as psychopathologies in later life.

Ultimately, the conservation of the HPA axis has underscored its critical adaptive roles in vertebrates, so, too, various invertebrate species over time. The HPA axis plays a clear role in the production of corticosteroids, which govern many facets of brain development and responses to ongoing environmental stress. With these findings, animal model research has served to identify what these roles are – with regards to animal development and evolutionary adaptation. In more precarious, primitive times, a heightened HPA axis may have served to protect organisms from predators and extreme environmental conditions, such as weather and natural disasters, by encouraging migration (i.e. fleeing), the mobilization of energy, learning (in the face of novel, dangerous stimuli) as well as increased appetite for biochemical energy storage. In contemporary society, the endurance of the HPA axis and early life programming will have important implications for counseling expecting and new mothers, as well as individuals who may have experienced significant early life adversity.

See also
Other major neuroendocrine systems
 Hypothalamic–neurohypophyseal system
 Hypothalamic–pituitary–gonadal axis
 Hypothalamic–pituitary–thyroid axis

Related topics

Conditions:
 Addison's disease
 Adrenal insufficiency
 Cushing's syndrome

References

External links

 Mind-Body-Health.net page on HPA axis
 HPA Axis: Explanation of the Body's Central Stress Response System w/Diagram

Anxiety
Attention
Neuroendocrinology
Stress (biology)